Wambon also known as Wambon Tekamerop, are an indigenous people that inhabit the lowlands in the southern part of Papua New Guinea. Wambon people are the largest ethnic group in Boven Digoel Regency.

Mythological
In the beliefs of the tribes in the southern interior of Papua, one figure is known as Tumolop. For the Wambon people, Tumolop is their god. He is the one who sent down his son in a form that cannot be explained realistically. This creature, the son of the Tumolop, is called Beten, which became the forerunner of the large ethnic groups from the jungles of Papua, but has since spread to various parts of Papua Island.

The theological legend of the Wambon and Awyu people is almost similar to the procession of the Torah to The Bible in Christian beliefs. That in the beginning was the word, and the word was God who made.

Notable peoples
Benediktus Tambonop, former regent of Boven Digoel Regency
Kornelis Jowayup, chief of the Wambon tribe

See also

Indigenous people of New Guinea

References

Ethnic groups in Indonesia
Ethnic groups in South Papua
Indigenous ethnic groups in Western New Guinea